Cornelis "Cees" van Bruchem  (born 25 February 1950 in Bruchem) is a former Dutch politician. Until 2008, he was a member of the ChristianUnion (ChristenUnie). Before that he was a member of its predecessor the Reformatory Political Federation (RPF). He was a Senator from 1999 to 2003. Previously he was a councillor from Kerkwijk and Zaltbommel, and also an alderman in last one.

References 
  Parlement.com biography

1950 births
Living people
Aldermen in Gelderland
Christian Union (Netherlands) politicians
21st-century Dutch politicians
Dutch agronomists
Dutch corporate directors
Dutch members of the Dutch Reformed Church
Members of the Senate (Netherlands)
People from Zaltbommel
Reformatory Political Federation politicians
Wageningen University and Research alumni